Thechambu is a village development committee in the Himalayas of Taplejung District in the Province No. 1 of northeastern Nepal. At the time of the 1991 Nepal census it had a population of 3428 people living in 606 individual households. The main ethnics of Thechambu are Limbus of Menyangbo tribes and clans. Thachambu is known for oranges, lemons, and guava.

References

External links
UN map of the municipalities of Taplejung District

Populated places in Taplejung District